Jupiter Inlet Colony is a town in Palm Beach County, Florida, United States. The population was 405 at the 2020 census.

Geography

Jupiter Inlet Colony is located at  (26.947393, –80.074616), in the southernmost tip of Jupiter Island.

Demographics

At the 2000 census there were 368 people, 180 households, and 124 families in the town. The racial makeup of the town was 99.73% White, and 0.27% from other races.
Of the 180 households 12.2% had children under the age of 18 living with them, 64.4% were married couples living together, 3.3% had a female householder with no husband present, and 31.1% were non-families. 23.9% of households were one person and 15.0% were one person aged 65 or older.  The average household size was 2.04 and the average family size was 2.38.

The age distribution was 10.6% under the age of 18, 1.1% from 18 to 24, 12.2% from 25 to 44, 36.1% from 45 to 64, and 39.9% 65 or older.  The median age was 60 years. For every 100 females, there were 98.9 males.  For every 100 females age 18 and over, there were 92.4 males.

The median household income was $65,938 and the median family income  was $93,554. Males had a median income of $90,000 versus $41,875 for females. The per capita income for the town was $66,713.  About 1.6% of families and 3.9% of the population were below the poverty line, including 10.0% of those under age 18 and 1.2% of those age 65 or over.

As of 2000, 100% of the population spoke English as their first language. It, along with Briny Breezes, Cloud Lake, and Golf, were the only municipalities in Palm Beach county with all residents having the mother tongue of English.

Roads

Beacon Ln.
Colony Rd.
Ocean Dr.
Beach Rd. (County Road 707)
Shelter Ln.
Lighthouse Dr.
Treasure Pl.

Notable people

 Perry Como, lived on Lighthouse Drive for 29 years, until his death in 2001
 Alan Jackson, moved to Jupiter Island
 Olivia Newton-John, resided there from 2009 to 2013 then moved to a condo nearby until 2015.
 Kid Rock, still lives at Jupiter Inlet Colony
 Tammy Wynette, moved to Jupiter Island

References

External links
Jupiter Inlet Colony at the  Palm Beach County Convention and Visitors Bureau

Towns in Palm Beach County, Florida
Towns in Florida
Populated coastal places in Florida on the Atlantic Ocean
Beaches of Palm Beach County, Florida
Beaches of Florida